The Acampsohelconinae are a subfamily of braconid parasitoid wasps. Extant members of this subfamily were previously included in the Helconinae, Blacinae, or Sigalphinae. The four genera included are †Acampsohelcon, Afrocampsis, Canalicephalus, and Urosigalphus.

Description and distribution 
Acampsohelconinae are non-cyclostome braconids with a carapace covering the metasoma. The outer hind tarsal claws are modified and much larger than the midtarsal claws. 

Canalicephalus has an Indo-Australian distribution,  Afrocampsis has an Afrotropical distribution, and Urosigalphus is found mostly in the New World with one species found in Japan.

Biology 
Hosts and habits of most Acampsohelconinae are unknown, but members of Urosigalphus are parasitoids of seed feeding beetle grubs in the Bruchidae and Curculionidae.

References

External links 
 Photos on BugGuide
 DNA barcodes at BOLD systems

Braconidae
Apocrita subfamilies